Tryggve Saxén (died March 2, 1970) was the first rector of the University of Vaasa (known as Vaasan kauppakorkeakoulu, Vaasa School of Economics at the time). 

Saxén was also a professor of mathematical economics and statistics. He died at the age of 49.

References 

1920s births
1970 deaths
Rectors of universities and colleges in Finland
Academic staff of the University of Vaasa
Year of birth missing